This Is Ivy League  was an indie band formed in 2005 by friends Ryland Blackinton and Alex Suarez (of Cobra Starship).

Formation
Alex and Ryland met in 1997 in high school. Both were avid guitar players and both played in local bands with varying degrees of accolade. This Is Ivy League formed in August 2005 when Ryland discovered that  Alex was not only still playing music but living just ten minutes away from him in Brooklyn, New York and the two began a collaboration.  Although they spent most of their time touring with Cobra Starship, Alex and Ryland continued to write songs for This Is Ivy League, vowing to record an album once Cobra settled down. The album was released on April 1, 2008 on TwentySeven Records. The album, like the London Bridges EP, was recorded entirely between the duo's Brooklyn apartments.

Discography
 London Bridges EP
 This Is Ivy League

References

Indie rock musical groups from New York (state)
Musical groups established in 2005
Musical groups from New York City